{{Infobox religious building
| name                  = Madina Masjid & Islamic Centre
| native_name           = মদিনা মসজিদ & ইসলামিক সেন্টার
| religious_affiliation = Sunni Islam
| image                 = MMIC LogoC.svg
| image_upright         = 
| caption               = Masjid logo
| map_type              = Greater Manchester
| coordinates           = 
| map_size              = 220
| location              = 29 Stansfield Street,
Oldham, Greater Manchester,
OL1 2HA
| country               = United Kingdom
| type                  = Mosque
| leadership            = Imam:Abu Saleh Muhammad Mamun
Chairman:Md Abdul HayeVice chairman:Ansar Ahmed
 General Secretary:Abid Miah
 Treasurer:Abdul Shohid
 Mutawalli:Rajuk Miah
 Assistant Mutawalli:''Amir Uddin

| website               = https://mmic.org.uk
| established           = 1987
| capacity              = 1000
| materials             = 
}}Madina Masjid & Islamic Centre''' (Bengali: মদিনা মসজিদ & ইসলামিক সেন্টার) is a mosque in Oldham, United Kingdom. It was established in 1987, making it one of the oldest mosques in the area.

Facilities

Prayers 
Madina Masjid & Islamic Centre holds 5 daily prayers and weekly Friday sermons. Sermons are given in Bengali, English and Arabic. The prayer hall has a combined capacity of 1000 worshippers, including the extension to the mosque built in 2014.

Maktab Classes 
The Masjid provides evening Quran and Hifz classes for children. Madina Masjid & Islamic Centre also holds Darul Qirat – a summer course that teaches authentic recitation of the Quran.

Events 

 Nikah Ceremonies
 Talks by guest speakers
 Iftar gatherings during Ramadan
 Monthly Halaqah
 Eid

Funeral Services 

After plans were granted in 2018, construction on the funeral services building began in 2019, and opened on 4 July 2021.

Services offered: 

 Burials throughout the North of England
 Transportation of bodies abroad
 Janaza
 Shinni for distribution
 Headstones
 Coffins
 Ghusl & Kaffan service

History

Former Premises (?-1987) 
The building was originally used as a school. In 1963, it was converted to a Ukrainian Catholic Church, named after SS. Peter and Paul.

Masjid (1987–present) 
When the Church left the building for Northmoor, the British Bangladeshi community in Oldham purchased it and established the current Masjid in 1987.

Extension of the prayer hall 
In 2013, a plan for the extension of the Masjid's prayer hall and the allocation of parking space was approved. Construction finished in 2014, significantly increasing the Masjid's capacity of worshippers. To cover expenses on the interior and ablution area, Madina Masjid & Islamic Centre launched their first fundraising campaign on Channel i during Ramadan.

COVID-19 
During the COVID-19 pandemic, all mosques in the UK, including Madina Masjid & Islamic Centre, were closed. The Masjid opened again in July 2020.

Gallery

See also 

 Islamic architecture
 Abdul Latif Chowdhury Fultali
 Brick Lane Mosque
 British Bangladeshi
 Islamic schools and branches
 List of mosques in the United Kingdom

References

External links 

  
 Madina Masjid & Islamic Centre YouTube Channel

Mosques in England
Mosques in the United Kingdom
Buildings and structures in Oldham